Juha Riippa (born 12 September 1968 in Kokkola) is a Finnish former football player, who played in defence and midfield. Riippa won the Finnish league championship in 1996 with FC Jazz.

Riippa played one international match for Finland in 1996.

Clubs

1986–1989 FC Ilves (74 matches, 3 goals)
1990 KPV (23 matches, 1 goal)
1991 PPT (33 matches, 4 goals)
1992 FC Jazz (33 matches, 7 goals)
1994–1998 FC Jazz (119 matches, 20 goals)
1996 Hibernian (1 match)
1999 HJK (5 matches)
2000–2003 FC Jazz (89 matches, 7 goals)

Honours

Finnish league championship (1): 1996

References

External links
Profile

1968 births
Living people
Finnish footballers
Finland international footballers
Finnish expatriate footballers
Expatriate footballers in Scotland
Association football defenders
Association football midfielders
People from Kokkola
FC Jazz players
Hibernian F.C. players
Helsingin Jalkapalloklubi players
Veikkausliiga players
Scottish Football League players
Sportspeople from Central Ostrobothnia
20th-century Finnish people